Abul Kalam Mohammad Ziaur Rahman is a major general of the Bangladesh Army and the executive chairman of the Bangladesh Export Processing Zones Authority (Bepza). Prior to join, BEPZA, he was GOC of the 7th Infantry Division and Commander of Barishal Area. He is a former Defence Advisor of the Bangladesh High Commission to India.

Career
Rahman was the commander of 9 Artillery Brigade in Savar Cantonment while he was a brigadier general. He served for the 'United Nations' twice. Once in Haiti and another in Sudan.

Rahman was posted at the Defence Services Command and Staff College as the directing staff. He taught at the Bangladesh Military Academy.

Later, Rahman was appointed the Defence Advisor of the Bangladesh High Commission to India on 29 May 2017, replacing Brigadier general Md Abdul Hamid.

Rahman commanded the 7th Infantry Division. On 7 November 2021, Rahman was appointed chairman of Bangladesh Export Processing Zones Authority. He replaced Major General Md Nazrul Islam. In December 2021, Rahman inaugurated hostels for women in Mongla Export Processing Zone.

Rahman signed an agreement for the establishment of Big Dipper Textile Mills Limited, a Canadian-Chinese company, factory in Ishwardi Export Processing Zone worth US$91 million in 2022. He saw the signing of an investment agreement with M/s Nova Intima Limited, British Virgin Islands-Hong Kong based company, to establish a factory worth US$28 million.

References

Living people
Bangladesh Army generals
Year of birth missing (living people)
Bangladeshi generals
Bangladeshi military personnel